Caleb Smith (born October 15, 1996) is an American professional soccer player who most recently played as a defender for USL Championship club Pittsburgh Riverhounds SC.

Youth career 
At the age of five, Smith began playing soccer recreationally with his older brother at Cutler Ridge Soccer Association in Miami. In 2005, Smith and his family moved to Texas and there Smith found his true passion for soccer. He started out playing for a local club called Texas Lightning. He soon moved to Solar Soccer Club where he honed his skills throughout the entirety of his youth career. Through the guidance of his coaches, Greg Oglesby, Ray Deleon, Adrian Solca, and Kevin Smith, he developed into one of the best players in the country for his age group. In 2013, Smith was selected as a member of the U17 National Team. There he lived in Florida for six months and trained and played in matches with the 32 best players of his age group. On July 20, 2013 Smith was part of Solar Chelsea that played Real Salt Lake in the USDA National Championship. Although losing 4-2, that marked the first time that a Solar team played in the USDA National Championship. In 2014, Smith was called up to the U-20 National Team to participate in the 2014 NTC Invitational Tournament against Chile, Bermuda, and Australia. Smith made his U-20 debut against Bermuda and recorded an assist in the first half.

College career
Playing predominately at midfield, Smith accumulated 67 appearances (49 starts), three goals and two assists in his SMU career (2015-18). He fielded playing time from the start of his duration with the Mustangs, posting 16 starts and 22 games played as a freshman. He also was named to the American Athletic Conference All-Rookie Team. He was part of some of SMU's most dynamic teams as he won three Regular Season Conference Championships and two Conference Tournament Championships in his college career. He played a pivotal role in the 2017 season helping SMU win the first "double" (Winning both the Regular Season and Conference Tournament Championship) in the history of the American Athletic Conference.

Professional career
Caleb Smith signed his first professional contract with USL Championship side, Pittsburgh Riverhounds, on February 22, 2019. He made his professional debut on March 23, 2019 against Swope Park Rangers in Children's Mercy Park Stadium.

Personal
Caleb is the son of Stan and Cassandra Smith. He has an older brother named Stanley and a younger sister named Hillary

References

External links
Profile at SMU Athletics

1996 births
Living people
American soccer players
Association football defenders
SMU Mustangs men's soccer players
Pittsburgh Riverhounds SC players
USL League Two players
USL Championship players
Soccer players from Texas
Sportspeople from Arlington, Texas